The Exploits of the Incomparable Mulla Nasrudin is a book by the writer Idries Shah, It consists of jokes and anecdotes involving the wise fool of Middle Eastern folklore, Mulla Nasrudin. Published by Octagon Press in 1966, the book was re-released in paperback, ebook and audiobook editions by The Idries Shah Foundation in 2014 and 2015.

Shortly before he died, Shah stated that his books form a complete course that could fulfil the function he had fulfilled while alive. As such, The Exploits of the Incomparable Mulla Nasrudin can be read as part of a whole course of study.

Content

Part of a series of books, The Exploits of the Incomparable Mulla Nasrudin is a collection of anecdotes and jokes drawn from Middle Eastern folklore and the Sufi mystical tradition, which feature the populist Middle Eastern philosopher and wise fool, Mulla Nasrudin.

Thousands of stories have been written around this popular folk character over the centuries, since his purported birth in the 13th century in what is now modern Turkey.

Use of the materials
Masters in the Sufi mystical tradition have used these anecdotes and jokes as teaching stories, as part of their pupils' training in wisdom.

The animator, Richard Williams illustrated the original series of Nasrudin books, and also created a film animation featuring the character, titled The Thief and the Cobbler, which was produced by Idries Shah's brother, Omar Ali-Shah. Unfortunately, this film was taken away from Williams before he had a chance to complete it.

In an article in the Los Angeles Review of Books, writer John Zada uses the Sufi materials, including some of the Nasrudin tales, to explain developments in the contemporary world, such as the rise of Islamist fundamentalism under ISIS and the rise of Donald Trump. Zada is of the opinion that we need the Sufis' moderate and flexible thinking to counter polemics and fanaticism in all its forms.

Collections of Mulla Nasrudin stories
 The Exploits of the Incomparable Mulla Nasrudin  (1966, 2015)
 The Pleasantries of the Incredible Mulla Nasrudin  (1968, 2015)
 The Subtleties of the Inimitable Mulla Nasrudin  (1973)
Note: ISBNs refer to the original paperback editions, published by Octagon Press. For current ISBNs, see The Idries Shah Foundation.

References

External links
 The Idries Shah Foundation official web site
 ISF Publishing

Sufi literature
Sufi fiction
Books by Idries Shah
Middle Eastern folklore
Comedy books
1966 books
Nasreddin